Santa Luzia was a 30-gun and 360-tonne Portuguese galleon, known for defeating a Dutch squadron single-handedly twice in 1650.

Service history  

On 21 February 1650, off Cape St. Augustine, Santa Luzia, under the command of Bernardo Ramires Esquível, was attacked by a squadron of nine Dutch ships, under the command of Caspar Govertsz Cop. Santa Luzia defended himself with a violent artillery duel, that lasted until the night. After the combat, Santa Luzia anchored near the coast, in order to take care of the wounded and repair the damage suffered.

On 22 February, in the morning, the combat returned. Maneuvering ably, Esquível didn't cease fire on the Dutch ships that dared to approach Santa Luzia, causing a lot of damage and casualties. Possibly because they didn't have soldiers enough, the Dutch ships didn't attempt to board Santa Luzia. By the mid-afternoon, having come to the conclusion that Santa Luzia was too hard to defeat, Cop put an end to the fight by retreating to the north.

Santa Luzia's fate after this is unknown.

References

Citations

Bibliography 

 
 
 

Galleons